Janine Marie Elizabeth de Leon Gutierrez (born October 2, 1989) known professionally as Janine Gutierrez, is a Filipino actress, television host, commercial model, and singer. She is currently an exclusive talent of ABS-CBN, albeit the absence of its fresh, legislative franchise.

Gutierrez is a Best Actress winner at the 68th FAMAS Awards, Gawad Urian Awards and QCinema International Film Festival. In 2021, she was recognized with a 'Rising Star Asia Award' at the 20th New York Asian Film Festival. The following year, Gutierrez was ranked fifty-first on the '100 Most Beautiful Faces in the World' list by TC Candler.

Personal life
The eldest of four siblings, Gutierrez comes from a family of actors. Her parents are Ramon Christopher Gutierrez and Lotlot de Leon. Her paternal grandparents are Pilita Corrales and Eddie Gutierrez. Donald Olson and Eva Rodriguez are her biological maternal grandparents. Actors Christopher de Leon and Nora Aunor are her adoptive maternal grandparents. She attended St. Paul College, Pasig, an all girls' school for her basic education.

Filmography

Television

Movies

Awards and nominations

References

External links
Janine Gutierrez Biography
Janine Gutierrez at GMANetwork.com

1989 births
Living people
Actresses from Metro Manila
Ateneo de Manila University alumni
Filipino female models
Filipino people of American descent
Filipino people of Canadian descent
Filipino people of Spanish descent
Filipino television actresses
Filipino television variety show hosts
J
GMA Network personalities
ABS-CBN personalities
Janine
People from Quezon City
Tagalog people